This is a list of events from British radio in 1964.

Events

January
5 January – Alan Freeman returns as host of Pick of the Pops.

February
No events

March
27 March – Children's Hour (renamed For the Young) is broadcast for the last time, on the BBC Home Service.
28 March – Radio Caroline, a "pirate" radio station set up by Ronan O'Rahilly broadcasting from MV Caroline anchored in international waters off Felixstowe, debuts as Europe's first all-day English-language pop music station.

April
3 April – The radio comedy series I'm Sorry, I'll Read That Again makes its debut, on the BBC Home Service.

May
12 May – "Pirate" radio station Radio Atlanta begins broadcasting from  anchored off Frinton; in July its operations are merged with Radio Caroline.
27 May – Screaming Lord Sutch begins broadcasting from "pirate" station Radio Sutch on Shivering Sands Army Fort offshore in the Thames Estuary; he soon sells the operation to his manager Reginald Calvert who renames it Radio City.

June
29 June – Launch of Manx Radio, the Isle of Man's national radio station.

July
No events

August
31 August – Farming Today moves from Network Three to the BBC Home Service.

September
No events

October
6 October – The variety programme Workers' Playtime is aired for the last time, on the Light Programme.

November
No events

December
1 December – Radio Caroline publicity officer David Block contacts the BBC to request a copy of the Queen's Christmas Message with the intention of broadcasting it on Christmas Day, but is turned down because Radio Caroline is not an authorised broadcaster.
23 December – The "pirate" station Wonderful Radio London goes on air broadcasting from MV Galaxy anchored off Frinton with a Fab 40 playlist of popular records.

Station debuts
28 March – Radio Caroline (1964–Present)
29 June – Manx Radio (1964–Present)
23 December – Wonderful Radio London (1964–1967)

Programme debuts
 17 March – Many a Slip on the BBC Home Service (1964–1979)
 3 April – I'm Sorry, I'll Read That Again on the BBC Home Service (1964–1973)
 26 July – Play it Cool on the BBC Light Programme (1964)

Continuing radio programmes

1940s
 Music While You Work (1940–1967)
 Sunday Half Hour (1940–2018)
 Desert Island Discs (1942–Present)
 Family Favourites (1945–1980)
 Down Your Way (1946–1992)
 Have A Go (1946–1967)
 Housewives' Choice (1946–1967)
 Letter from America (1946–2004)
 Woman's Hour (1946–Present)
 Twenty Questions (1947–1976)
 Any Questions? (1948–Present)
 The Dales (1948–1969)
 Billy Cotton Band Show (1949–1968)
 A Book at Bedtime (1949–Present)

1950s
 The Archers (1950–Present)
 Listen with Mother (1950–1982)
 From Our Own Correspondent (1955–Present)
 Pick of the Pops (1955–Present)
 The Clitheroe Kid (1957–1972)
 My Word! (1957–1988)
 Test Match Special (1957–Present)
 The Today Programme (1957–Present)
 The Navy Lark (1959–1977)
 Sing Something Simple (1959–2001)
 Your Hundred Best Tunes (1959–2007)

1960s
 Farming Today (1960–Present)
 Easy Beat (1960–1967)
 In Touch (1961–Present)
 The Men from the Ministry (1962–1977)

Births
11 January – Tony Livesey, journalist and radio presenter
24 February – Andy Crane, television and radio presenter
1 April – Jez Nelson, jazz presenter and media producer
16 May – Rebecca Front, comic actress and scriptwriter
23 June – Jane Garvey, radio presenter
27 June – Lynn Parsons, radio and television presenter
5 August – Rory Morrison, radio newsreader and continuity announcer (died 2013)
19 September – Patrick Marber, comedy performer and writer
27 September – Gilles Peterson, disc jockey
21 November – Liza Tarbuck, actress and radio and television presenter
28 November – Sian Williams, journalist and current affairs presenter
Unknown – Peter Kerry, writer of drama for radio and television

Deaths
28 September – Sir George Dyson, radio's "voice of music" (born 1883)
10 December – Charles Samuel Franklin, radio pioneer (born 1879)

See also 
 1964 in British music
 1964 in British television
 1964 in the United Kingdom
 List of British films of 1964

References

 
Radio
Years in British radio